Hypsilurus geelvinkianus, the New Guinea forest dragon, is a species of agama found in Indonesia and Papua New Guinea.

References

Hypsilurus
Taxa named by Wilhelm Peters
Taxa named by Giacomo Doria
Reptiles described in 1878
Agamid lizards of New Guinea